Joe Brito (born February 17, 1999) is an American professional soccer player who plays as a midfielder for Union Omaha in USL League One.

Career

Youth & College
Brito attended Bolton High School, and played as part of the New England Revolution academy between 2013 and 2017. Brito was named the Revolution Academy Player of the Year in 2016–17, after earning a spot on the U-18 Eastern Conference Best XI. During that season, Brito scored 16 goals in 25 appearances.

In 2017, Brito attended the University of North Carolina at Charlotte to play college soccer. Brito redshirted his senior year, but went on to make a total of 87 appearances for the 49ers, scoring 13 goals and tallying 23 assists. During his college career, Brito was a two-time All-Conference USA First Team selection and Conference USA All-Freshman team honors.

Professional
On March 22, 2022, Brito signed his first professional contract, joining USL League One side Union Omaha. He made his debut on April 9, 2022, starting in a 2–2 draw with Forward Madison.

References

External links
 Profile at the University of North Carolina at Charlotte Athletics

1999 births
Living people
American soccer players
American people of Portuguese descent
Association football midfielders
Charlotte 49ers men's soccer players
People from Bolton, Connecticut
Soccer players from Connecticut
Union Omaha players
USL League One players